Cesare Amè (18 November 1892 –  30 June 1983) was an Italian general and  intelligence officer.

Born in  Cumiana, Amè formed at the Modena Military School; appointed second lieutenant in permanent service in 1912, he joined the 92º Regiment of Turin, with whom he took part to the Italo-Turkish War. Promoted liaison officer, after the World War I he was awarded  one silver and two bronze medals.

In 1921, Amè entered the Italian Military Intelligence Service (Servizio Informazioni Militare, SIM), being  promoted to lieutenant colonel in 1927 and to colonel in 1937. He was appointed chief of SIM in 1940; during his service he tried to persuade Benito Mussolini to not entering war because of the Italian army's lack of preparation, and had to face Mussolini's reluctance to disclose his plans.

On 18 August 1943, after the fall of Mussolini, Amè was removed from office by Pietro Badoglio and was assigned to the command of the Italian army division in Ljubljana. In 1958 he was appointed divisional general. He was later author of Guerra segreta in Italia ("Secret war in Italy", 1956) and of Il Servizio informazioni militare dalla sua costituzione alla fine della seconda guerra mondiale ("The Military Intelligence Service from its establishment to the end of World War II", released anonymously in 1957).

References 

1892 births
1983 deaths
People from the Province of Turin
Italian generals
Italian military personnel of the Italo-Turkish War
Italian military personnel of World War I
Italian military personnel of World War II
Cumiana